Antennaria aromatica, the scented pussytoes, is a North American species of plants in the family Asteraceae.  It is native to the Rocky Mountains of Alberta, Montana, Idaho, and Wyoming. The crushed foliage has a strong scent resembling that of citronella.

References

External links
Montana Field Guide, Montana Natural Heritage Program, Aromatic Pussytoes - Antennaria aromatica
Phytoimages, Antennaria aromatica

aromatica
Flora of the Rocky Mountains
Plants described in 1984